The 2012–13 Turkish Cup was the 51st season of the Turkish Cup. Ziraat Bankası is the sponsor of the tournament, thus the sponsored name is Ziraat Turkish Cup. The winners earned a berth in the play-off round of the 2013–14 UEFA Europa League. Fenerbahçe are the defending champions. The winners also qualified for the 2013 Turkish Super Cup.

In a bet to widen the audience and turn the cup into a true national cup, a format change has been made for this season. The number of participating teams increased from 57 to 156, allowing teams from Turkish Regional Amateur League to have a shot at the cup. The knockout qualifying format of the 2011–2012 season have been revised. The group stage matches that were contested between 2005 and 2011 returned as a round-robin tournament.

Round and draw dates

First round
In the first round, 32 teams from the Turkish Regional Amateur League and 54 teams from the TFF Third League played in a one-legged knockout tournament. The 43 winners advanced to the second round. The draw for the first round took place on 14 September 2012 at 14:30 (EEST). A Haber broadcast the draw live on television.

|}

Second round
The most fixtures were played in the second round. 13 teams from the Süper Lig, 18 teams from the TFF Second League, 12 teams from the TFF Third League played matches against 43 winners from the first round. Also 22 teams from TFF Second League played against each other. 54 winners in this round advanced to the third round.

|}

Third round
54 winners of the second round played against each other. 27 winners advanced to the fourth round.

|}

Fourth round
5 teams from Süper Lig, that are playing in European competitions (namely, Galatasaray, Fenerbahçe, Trabzonspor, Bursaspor and Eskişehirspor) joined the 27 winners from third round. 32 teams competed for the fifth round and a seeding procedure was underway. Matches were played in first team's home ground. 16 teams advanced to the fifth round.

|}

Fifth round
The draw for the fifth round was on 6 December 2012. 16 winners of the fourth round played against each other for the last 8 spots for the group stage. The matches took place on 11–13 December 2012.

|}

Group stage
8 winners from the fifth and the last qualifying round were split into two groups of 4 teams. This stage was a round-robin tournament with home and away matches, in the vein of UEFA European competitions' group stages. The winners and runners-up of the two groups advanced to the semi-finals.

Group A

Group B

Bracket

Semi-finals
Winner of the first group was drawn against runners-up of the second group. Also the winners of the second group played against runners-up of the first group. The matches were contested as two-legged ties with home and away matches. The runners-up played the first match in their home ground. The winners of the two legs played in the final.

First leg

Second leg

Final

The final was contested in a neutral ground as a one-off match. The winners were awarded 50 medals per club along with the Turkish Cup trophy.

References

See also
2012–13 Süper Lig
2013 Turkish Cup Final
2013 Turkish Super Cup
2013–14 UEFA Europa League

2012-13
2012–13 domestic association football cups
Cup